Mark Alwin Clements (b. 1949) is an Australian botanist and orchidologist. He obtained his doctorate at the Australian National University defending his thesis entitled Reproductive Biology in relation to phylogeny of the Orchidaceae, especially the tribe Diurideae.

In 2008 he was a researcher at the Center for Research on Plant Biodiversity at the Australian National Botanic Gardens in Canberra. As of January 2012, it had identified and classified 1,992 new species.

Publications 
 
 Indsto, JO; Weston PH; Clements MA; Dyer AG; Batley M; Whelan RJ. 2006. Pollination of Diuris maculata (Orchidaceae) by male Trichocolletes venustus bees. Australian Journal of Botany 54 (7): 669
 MA Clements. 2006. Molecular phylogenetic systematics in Dendrobieae (Orchidaceae). Aliso 22: 465—480
 Indsto, JO; PH Weston; MA Clements; RJ Whelan. 2005. Highly sensitive DNA fingerprinting of orchid pollinaria remnants using AFLP. Australian Systematic Botany 18 (3): 207 - 213
 MA Clements. 2003. Molecular phylogenetic systematics in the Dendrobiinae (Orchidaceae), with emphasis on Dendrobium section Pedilonum. Telopea 10: 247—298
 Jones, DL; MA Clement. 2002. A Review of Pterestylis (orchidaceae). Ed. Australian Orchid Foundation.

Honours 
 (Orchidaceae) Flickingeria clementsii D.L.Jones
 (Orchidaceae) Microtatorchis clementsii D.L.Jones and B.Gray

References

External links 
 
 Mark Clements at the Center for Australian National Biodiversity Research

Australian National University alumni
20th-century Australian botanists
1949 births
Living people
21st-century Australian botanists